Karen Chapman née Karen Puttick (born 21 May 1959) is a retired badminton player of England.

Career 
She won the bronze medal at the 1983 IBF World Championships in mixed doubles with Mike Tredgett.

She represented England and won two gold medals in the team event and mixed doubles and a bronze medal in the women's doubles, at the 1982 Commonwealth Games in Brisbane, Queensland, Australia.

Achievements

World Cup 
Mixed doubles

References 

 European results
 English statistics

1959 births
Living people
English female badminton players
Badminton players at the 1982 Commonwealth Games
Commonwealth Games gold medallists for England
Commonwealth Games bronze medallists for England
Commonwealth Games medallists in badminton
Medallists at the 1982 Commonwealth Games